Lệ Thủy is a district of Quảng Bình province in the North Central Coast of Vietnam. The district borders Quảng Ninh district on the north, Vĩnh Linh district (Quảng Trị province) on the south, Laos on the west (with the Annamite Range as natural borderline). Lệ Thủy central is 40 km south of the provincial capital Đồng Hới. The district government seat is Kiến Giang Township. The district area is 1420.52 km2, population: 140,804 (1998).
Lệ Thủy district is home to Võ Nguyên Giáp and the family of Ngô Đình Diệm. Economy bases on agriculture, mainly rice culture.
Mỹ Trạch massacre by French army happened here on 29 November 1947.

Subdivisions 
This district has two townlets and 25 communes (xã)
 Two townlets: Kiến Giang  and Nông Trường Lệ Ninh.
 26 communes: 
Hồng Thủy, Ngư Thủy Bắc, Ngư Thủy, Thanh Thủy, Lộc Thủy, Hoa Thủy, Cam Thủy, Liên Thủy, Phong Thủy, An Thủy, Sơn Thủy, Ngân Thủy, Hải Thủy, Hưng Thủy, Tân Thủy, Xuân Thủy, Dương Thủy, Mai Thủy, Phú Thủy, Mỹ Thủy, Sen Thủy, Trường Thủy, Văn Thủy, Kim Thủy, Thái Thủy.

Geography 

The western portion of the district is characterized by the Annamite Range, where the Ho Chi Minh trail ran through in Vietnam War. The area slope is lower towards the east to the narrow plain of Kiến Giang River. The east side is the coastline with a range of sand dunes (with the width of around 10 km). The seasides here are wild and clean with several fishing villages. The district is home to Bang Spa, a mineral hot spring and is also a regular tourist destination.

Economy 
The district's economy is largely based on agriculture and forestry. The district has two townships: Kiến Giang Township and Nông Trường Lệ Ninh. There are some fine sand beaches along the South China Sea coast and a hot mineral spring in the west of this district but they are mainly visited by local inhabitants only.

Transportation 
The National Route 1, Ho Chi Minh Highway, and Hanoi-Saigon Railway run through the district.

Famous residents  
 Ngô Đình Diệm - the first president of South Vietnam. 
 Ngô Đình Khả - Ngô Đình Diệm's father. 
 Võ Nguyên Giáp - a general of Vietnam People's Army.
 Dương Văn An - a mandarin, historian in the Nguyễn dynasty.
 Nguyễn Hữu Cảnh - a mandarin of Nguyễn lords who established Vietnam's sovereignty in Saigon.
 Lâm Thị Mỹ Dạ - poet.
 Hoàng Kế Viêm - a mandarin of the Nguyễn dynasty

Culture 
This district is home to Hò khoan Lệ Thủy.

Former location name before 1945

Thủy Liên Canton (Tổng Thủy Liên) 
 Đặng Lộc xã
 Phò Chánh xã (Cung)
 Thủy Liên thôn (Quán Sen)
 Hòa Luật Đông (Hòa Đông)
 Thủy Liên Nam (Quán Trảy)
 Hòa Luật Bắc (Hòa Bắc)
 Trung Luật Thôn (Cây Cúp)
 Thử Luật Tây 
 Hòa Luật Nam (Ngoại Hải)
 Liêm Luật xã 
 Trung Luật xã
 Thương Luật xã
 Thủy Liên Đông (Quán Cát)
 Phò Thiết ấp (Hủ Thiết)
 Thủy Liên Hạ (Quán Bụt)

Mỹ Trạch Canton 
 Cổ Liễu xã (Tréo)
 Liêm Thiện xã (Làng Liêm)
 Mỹ Thổ xã (Làng Ngói)
 Luật Sơn ấp 
 Quy Hậu xã
 Dương Xá xã (Làng Dương)
 Mỹ Trạch Thượng
 Mỹ Trạch Hạ
 Tâm Duyệt xã
 Uẩn Áo xã (Nha Ngo)
 Thuận Trạch phường (Trạm)
 Tân Hậu phường
 Mỹ Son ấp (Thượng Lâm)
 Dương Xuân xã (Ba Canh)
 Tân Mỹ phường (Mỹ Lê)
 Tiểu Giang phường (Phường Tiểu)

Phong Lộc Canton 
 Đại Phong Lộc xã (đợi)
 Mỹ Phước Thôn (Nhà Cồn)
 Tuy Lộc xã (Tuy)
 An Lạc phường
 An Xá xã (Thá)
 An Xá Hạ

Thạch Xá Canton 
 Tân Việt phường
 Binh Phú ấp

Thượng Phong Lộc Canton 
 Xuân Hồi xã (Hồi)
 Phú Thọ xã (Nhà Ngô)
 Thượng Phong Lộc xã (Làng Tiểu)

Xuân Lai Canton 
 Xuân Lai xã
 Xuân Bồ xã
 Hoàng Giang xã (Nhà Vàng)
 Phan Xá xã (Nhà Phan)
 Quảng Cư xã (Làng Chềng)
 Lệ Xã xã (Kẻ Lê)
 Thái Xá xã (Nhà Cai)
 Thạch Bàn Thượng (Chợ Thẹc)
 Mai Xá Thượng
 Mai Xá Hạ (Nhà Mòi)
 Châu Xả Xã (Kẻ Châu)
 Phú Bình Phong

Mỹ Lộc Canton 
 Mỹ Lộc xã (Mỹ Lược)
 Quy Trình xã
 Văn Xá xã
 Phú Hòa xã
 Lương Thiện xã
 Phu Gia xã
 Lộc An xã 
 Phú Kỳ xã

References

External links 
 Lệ Thủy district on Quảng Bình government official website

Districts of Quảng Bình province
Võ Nguyên Giáp